Blennosperma nanum is an annual plant in the daisy family native to California. Common names include glue-seed, common stickyseed, and yellow carpet.

Description
It is an annual with small yellow flower heads The heads are a paler yellow than many other daisy-like flowers, and the ring of stamens ooze a viscous white juice containing the pollen. The fruits are also carried in a gluey fluid. The Greek name for the genus means "slimy seed."

Distribution
The species is distributed throughout the lower elevations in California from Shasta County to San Diego County, but nowhere is it particularly abundant. It is a resident of vernal pool floral communities. Glue-seed is often one of the first flowers to bloom as winter turns to spring.

Subspecies
 Blennosperma nanum var. robustum: the Point Reyes subspecies of the plant, sometimes called Point Reyes blennosperma, is very rare and is only found in that isolated area. 
 Blennosperma nanum var. nanum is much more common, and is sometimes called common blennosperma, yellow carpet, or meadow daisy.

References

External links
Jepson Flora Project: Blennosperma nanum

Senecioneae
Endemic flora of California
Flora of the Sierra Nevada (United States)
Natural history of the California chaparral and woodlands
Natural history of the California Coast Ranges
Natural history of the Central Valley (California)
Natural history of the Peninsular Ranges
Endemic flora of the San Francisco Bay Area
Plants described in 1833
Taxa named by William Jackson Hooker
Flora without expected TNC conservation status